In the summer of 1972, Paul McCartney's newly formed band, Wings, set out on a concert tour of Europe, in a double decker bus, WNO 481.

Promotion
Coming on the heels of a tour of English universities, the Wings Over Europe Tour was intended to promote recent singles "Give Ireland Back to the Irish" and "Mary Had a Little Lamb", as well as provide live recordings to be included on a future album. The second objective did not come to fruition for a long time, the album Red Rose Speedway was released in Spring of the next year without any of the concert material. Only the 21 August performance of "The Mess" at The Hague was officially released, as a B-side to the single "My Love". 

The live version of new song "Best Friend" was intended to be released as part of Cold Cuts compilation album, but the album was abandoned permanently.

In 2012 a live track consisting of "Eat at Home" and "Smile Away" recorded in Groningen was released as an iTunes exclusive to the reissue of Paul and Linda McCartney's Ram.

Only in 2018, a newly compiled live album Wings Over Europe was released in the limited edition boxset Wings 1971-73 in the Paul McCartney Archive Collection., while "Best Friend" and "1882" were also released as part of Red Rose Speedway reissue.

Touring
The band, with the McCartney children and their road crew, loaded up in a brightly coloured double decker bus for the tour of the continent. The tour proceeded largely without incident, but on 10 August in Gothenburg, Sweden, Paul and Linda McCartney were fined US$1,200 for possession of marijuana. Paul joked that the incident would “make good publicity” for the tour, in comments reported around the world at the time (e.g. Miami Herald, 12 August 1972). The Daily Telegraph (12 August 1972) quoted "a member of the group" as saying that this was an "excellent advertisement... Our name flies now all over the world".

Wings' line up for the tour was Paul and Linda McCartney, Denny Laine, Henry McCullough, and Denny Seiwell.

Tour dates

Set list

References

Wings (band) concert tours
1972 concert tours